John Gibson (dates unknown) was an English cricketer who played first-class cricket from 1837 to 1842. He played for Nottingham Cricket Club (aka Nottinghamshire) and made four known appearances in first-class matches. He represented the North in the North v. South series.

References

English cricketers
English cricketers of 1826 to 1863
Nottinghamshire cricketers
North v South cricketers
Year of birth unknown
Year of death unknown
Players of Nottinghamshire cricketers